Cephalomelittia is a genus of moths in the family Sesiidae.

Species
Cephalomelittia tabaniformis  Gorbunov & Arita, 1995

References

Sesiidae